Empis is a genus of dance fly, in the fly family Empididae. It contains the following subgenera and species:

Anacrostichus Bezzi, 1909
Empis bistortae Meigen, 1822
Empis lucida Zetterstedt, 1838
Empis monticola Loew, 1868
Empis nitida Meigen, 1804
Empis verralli Collin, 1927
Argyrandrus Bezzi, 1909
Empis dispar Scholtz, 1851
Coptophlebia Bezzi, 1909
Empis albinervis Meigen, 1822
Empis hyalipennis Fallén, 1816
Empis impennis Strobl, 1902
Empis lindneri Smith, 1925
Empis vitripennis Meigen, 1822
Empis volucris Wiedemann in Meigen, 1822
Empis Linnaeus, 1758
Empis aestiva Loew, 1867
Empis bicuspidata Collin, 1927
Empis caudatula Loew, 1867
Empis chioptera Meigen, 1804
Empis decora Meigen, 1822
Empis limata Collin, 1927
Empis nigripes Fabricius, 1794
Empis nuntia Meigen, 1838
Empis pennipes Linnaeus, 1758
Empis planetica Collin, 1927
Empis praevia Collin, 1927
Empis prodromus Loew, 1867
Empis rufiventris Meigen, 1838
Empis syrovatkai Chvála, 1985
Empis tanysphyra Loew, 1873
Empis woodi Collin, 1927
Euempis Frey, 1953
Empis basalis Loew, 1873
Empis calcarata Bezzi, 1899
Empis ciliata Fabricius, 1787
Empis erosa Loew, 1869
Empis fiumana Egger, 1860
Empis kerteszi Bezzi, 1900
Empis mikii Strobl, 1899
Empis mirandica Chvála, 1981
Empis morenae Strobl, 1899
Empis morio Fabricius, 1794
Empis picipes Meigen, 1804
Empis pilicornis Loew, 1867
Empis sericans Brulle, 1833
Empis spiralis Collin, 1937
Empis tessellata Fabricius, 1794
Kritempis Collin, 1926
Empis livida Linnaeus, 1758
Leptempis Collin, 1926
Empis abdominalis Daugeron, 1999
Empis adusta Loew, 1869
Empis affinis Egger, 1860
Empis alpina Loew, 1867
Empis cognata Egger, 1860
Empis confusa Loew, 1865
Empis dimidiata Meigen in Gistl, 1835
Empis discolor Loew, 1856
Empis divisa Loew, 1869
Empis flavitarsis Roser, 1840
Empis gaigeri Gercke, 1886
Empis grisea Fallén, 1816
Empis lamellata Daugeron, 1999
Empis lamellimmanis Daugeron, 1999
Empis macra Loew, 1867
Empis maculata Fabricius, 1781
Empis meridionalis Meigen, 1822
Empis mesogramma Loew, 1867
Empis multispina Daugeron, 1999
Empis nigricans Meigen, 1804
Empis pandellei Daugeron, 1999
Empis pteropoda Egger, 1860
Empis rava Loew, 1862
Empis rustica Fallén, 1816
Empis sinuosa Daugeron, 1999
Empis spitzeri Chvála, 1977
Empis trunca Daugeron, 1999
Empis variegata Meigen, 1804
Lissempis Bezzi, 1909
Empis cuneipennis Bezzi, 1899
Empis curvitibia Chvála, 2003
Empis insularis Chvála, 2003
Empis liosoma Bezzi, 1909
Empis nigritarsis Meigen, 1804
Pachymeria Stephens, 1829
Empis femorata Fabricius, 1798
Empis scotica Curtis, 1835
Empis tumida Meigen, 1822
Platyptera Meigen, 1803
Empis borealis Linnaeus, 1758
Polyblepharis Bezzi, 1909
Empis albicans Meigen, 1822
Empis candidata Loew, 1873
Empis cothurnata Brulle, 1833
Empis crassa Nowicki, 1868
Empis curta Loew, 1869
Empis curvipes Loew, 1868
Empis dasynota Loew, 1869
Empis dedecor Loew, 1869
Empis depilis Loew, 1873
Empis divergens Loew, 1869
Empis engeli Chvála, 1999
Empis eumera Loew, 1868
Empis eversmanni Loew, 1873
Empis fallax Egger, 1860
Empis gravipes Loew, 1856
Empis haemi Loew, 1862
Empis haemorrhoica Loew, 1869
Empis lugubris Loew, 1869
Empis nigerrima Loew, 1862
Empis opaca Meigen, 1804
Empis phaenomeris Loew, 1868
Empis soror Collin, 1937
Empis strigata Loew, 1867
Rhadinempis Collin, 1926
Empis bazini Collin, 1926
Empis soror Collin, 1937
Xanthempis Bezzi, 1909
Empis adriani Chvála, 1996
Empis aemula Loew, 1873
Empis aequalis Loew, 1873
Empis albifrons Bezzi, 1909
Empis algecirasensis Strobl, 1909
Empis concolor Verrall, 1872
Empis digramma Meigen in Gistl, 1835
Empis dispina Chvála, 1996
Empis kuntzei Becker, 1910
Empis laeta Loew, 1869
Empis laetabilis Collin, 1926
Empis lagoensis Chvála, 1996
Empis loewiana Bezzi, 1909
Empis lutea Meigen, 1804
Empis nevadensis Chvála, 1981
Empis oxilara Shamshev, 1998<ref name="Shamshev1998">{{cite journal |last1=Shamshev |first1=Igor |title=Revision of the genus EmpisLinnaeus (Diptera: Empididae) from Russia and neighbouring lands. 1. Subgenus Xanthempis Bezzi |journal=International Journal of Dipterological Research |date=1998 |volume=9 |issue=2 |pages=127–170 |url=https://www.researchgate.net/publication/265215842 |access-date=23 June 2019}}</ref>Empis punctata Meigen, 1804Empis rohaceki Chvála, 1994Empis scutellata Curtis, 1835Empis semicinerea Loew, 1867Empis stercorea Linnaeus, 1761Empis styriaca Strobl, 1893Empis subscutellata Shamshev, 1998Empis testacea Fabricius, 1805Empis testiculata Bezzi, 1909Empis trigramma Wiedemann in Meigen, 1822Empis unistriata Becker, 1887Empis univittata'' Loew, 1867

Images
images at Barcode of Life Data System

See also
 List of Empis species

References

Empididae
Articles containing video clips
Empidoidea genera
Taxa named by Carl Linnaeus